Twenty-Five Mile Creek State Park is a public recreation area on the western side of Lake Chelan,  northwest of the city of Chelan in Chelan County, Washington. The  state park was a private resort that came into state ownership in 1972. It was operated under lease to various concessionaires until the state took over staffing in 1988. The park offers camping, a marina, fishing, waterskiing, bird watching, and mountain biking.

References

External links
Twenty-Five Mile Creek State Park Washington State Parks and Recreation Commission 
Twenty-Five Mile Creek State Parks Map Washington State Parks and Recreation Commission

Parks in Chelan County, Washington
State parks of Washington (state)